Jack Southwell Russell, 25th Baron de Clifford (2 July 1884 – 1 September 1909) was a British army officer and nobleman.

Family and succession
He was the only son of Edward Southwell Russell, 24th Baron de Clifford, and Hilda Balfour, and succeeded to the barony on the death of his father on 6 April 1894.

Military career
Lord de Clifford was commissioned as a second lieutenant in the Shropshire Imperial Yeomanry on 19 March 1902.

Marriage and death
He married the actress Evelyn Victoria Anne Chandler, known as Eva Carrington, on 16 February 1906 at the St. Pancras Registry Office. 

He died on 1 September 1909 aged 25, following a car accident at Small Dole, Bramber, Sussex, England, and was succeeded by his son Edward Southwell Russell.

References

ThePeerage.com
Baron de Clifford@Everything2.com

1884 births
1909 deaths
Shropshire Yeomanry officers
Road incident deaths in England
Barons de Clifford